Martín Landaluce Lacambra (born 8 January 2006) is a Spanish tennis player.

Landaluce has a career high ITF junior combined ranking of 9 achieved on 18 July 2022.
He won the 2022 US Open – Boys' singles title.

Personal life
He has trained at the Rafa Nadal Tennis Academy.

Junior Grand Slam titles

Singles: 1 (1 title)

References

External links

2006 births
Living people
Spanish male tennis players
US Open (tennis) junior champions
21st-century Spanish people